In differential geometry and gauge theory, the Nahm equations are a system of ordinary differential equations introduced by Werner Nahm in the context of the Nahm transform – an alternative to Ward's twistor construction of monopoles. The Nahm equations are formally analogous to the algebraic equations in the ADHM construction of instantons, where finite order matrices are replaced by differential operators. 

Deep study of the Nahm equations was carried out by Nigel Hitchin and Simon Donaldson. Conceptually, the equations arise in the process of infinite-dimensional hyperkähler reduction. They can also be viewed as a dimensional reduction of the anti-self-dual Yang-Mills equations .

Equations 

Let  be three matrix-valued meromorphic functions of a complex variable . The Nahm equations are a system of matrix differential equations

together with certain analyticity properties, reality conditions, and boundary conditions. The three equations can be written concisely using the Levi-Civita symbol, in the form

  

More generally, instead of considering  by  matrices, one can consider Nahm's equations with values in a Lie algebra .

Additional conditions 
The variable  is restricted to the open interval , and the following conditions are imposed:
 
 
 At the poles, the residues of  form an irreducible representation of the group SU(2).

Nahm–Hitchin description of monopoles 

There is a natural equivalence between 
 the monopoles of charge  for the group , modulo gauge transformations, and 

Lax representation 

The Nahm equations can be written in the Lax form as follows. Set

then the system of Nahm equations is equivalent to the Lax equation

Therefore, the characteristic equation 

See also 
Bogomolny equation
Yang–Mills–Higgs equations

References

External links 
Islands project – a wiki about the Nahm equations and related topics

Differential equations
Mathematical physics
Integrable systems
Equations of physics